The L'Oréal-UNESCO For Women in Science Awards, created in 1998, aim to improve the position of women in science by recognizing outstanding women researchers who have contributed to scientific progress. The awards are a result of a partnership between the French cosmetics company L'Oréal and the United Nations Educational, Scientific and Cultural Organization (UNESCO) and carry a grant of $100,000 USD for each laureate. This award is also known as the L'Oréal-Helena Rubinstein Women in Science Awards.

Each year an international jury awards five laureates, selecting one from each of the following regions:
 Africa and the Middle East.
 Asia-Pacific
 Europe
 Latin America and the Caribbean
 North America (since 2000)
Eligibility requirements alternate every other year based on scientific discipline with laureates in life sciences recognized in even years and laureates in material sciences and mathematics recognized in odd years.

The same partnership awards the UNESCO-L'Oréal International Fellowships, providing up to $40,000 USD in funding over two years to fifteen young women scientists engaged in exemplary and promising research projects. The Fellowship awards began in 2000 with a one-year award of US$20,000 and offered ten awards until 2003. In 2003, the number of awards increased to 15 and then in 2006, the grant period extended to two years and the amount of the award increased to US$40,000. In 2015, the name Rising Talent Grants was implemented.

Recipients

Notable Laureates 
Four laureates went on to win a Nobel Prize.

 Elizabeth Blackburn in Physiology or Medicine (2008)
 Ada Yonath in Chemistry (2009)
 Emmanuelle Charpentier in Chemistry (2020)
 Jennifer Doudna in Chemistry (2020)

1998 Laureates 
 Grace Oladunni Taylor (Nigeria): Biochemistry
 Myeong-Hee Yu (South Korea): Microbiology
 Pascale Cossart (France): Bacteriology
 Gloria Montenegro (Chile): Botany

2000 Laureates 
 Valerie Mizrahi (South Africa): Molecular biology
 Tsuneko Okazaki (Japan): Molecular biology
 Margarita Salas (Spain): Molecular biology
 Eugenia María del Pino Veintimilla (Ecuador): Molecular biology
 Joanne Chory (United States): Molecular biology

2000 Fellows 
2000 Fellowships awarded yearly to doctoral and post-doctoral women to allow them to pursue their research in host laboratories outside their home countries are:

2001 Laureates 
 Adeyinka Gladys Falusi (Nigeria): Molecular genetics
 Suzanne Cory (Australia): Molecular genetics
 Anne McLaren (United Kingdom): Reproductive biology
 Mayana Zatz (Brazil): Molecular biology
 Joan Argetsinger Steitz (United States): Molecular biophysics and biochemistry

2001 Fellows 
2001 Fellowships awarded yearly to doctoral and post-doctoral women to allow them to pursue their research in host laboratories outside their home countries are:

2002 Laureates 
 Nagwa Meguid (Egypt): Genetics applied to the prevention of mental diseases
 Indira Nath (India): The treatment of leprosy
 Mary Osborn (Germany): Methods for the observation of cell structures
 Ana María López Colomé (Mexico): Prevention of blindness.
 Shirley Tilghman (Canada, United States): Gene expression and parental origin of chromosomes

2002 Fellows 
2002 Fellowships awarded yearly to doctoral and post-doctoral women to allow them to pursue their research in host laboratories outside their home countries are:

2003 Laureates 
 Karimat El-Sayed (Egypt): Physics
 Li Fanghua (China): Electron microscopy
 Ayse Erzan (Turkey): Condensed matter physics
 Mariana Weissmann (Argentina): Computational condensed matter physics
 Johanna M.H. Levelt Sengers (United States): Thermodynamics

2003 Fellows 
2003 Fellowships awarded yearly to doctoral and post-doctoral women to allow them to pursue their research in host laboratories outside their home countries. The initial awards list stated one addition from the Pacific Rim region was pending. Other awardees are:

2004 Laureates 
 Jennifer Thomson (South Africa): "For work on transgenic plants resistant to drought and to viral infections, in an effort to respond to the continent's chronic food shortage."
 Lúcia Mendonça Previato (Brazil): "For studies which enable progress in the understanding, treatment and prevention of the Chagas disease."
 Philippa Marrack (United States)  "For the characterization of lymphocyte T functions in the immune system and the discovery of superantigens.
 Nancy Ip (China): "For discoveries concerning proteins which favour the growth and preservation of neurons in brain development."
 Christine Petit (France): "For research on the molecular and cellular bases of human hereditary deafness and other sensorial deficiencies."

2004 Fellows 
2004 Fellowships awarded yearly to doctoral and post-doctoral women to allow them to pursue their research in host laboratories outside their home countries are:

2005 Laureates 
 Zohra ben Lakhdar (Tunisia): "For experiments and models in infrared spectroscopy and its applications to pollution detection and medicine."
 Fumiko Yonezawa (Japan): "For pioneering theory and computer simulations on amorphous semiconductors and liquid metals."
 Dominique Langevin (France): "For fundamental investigations on detergents, emulsions and foams."
 Belita Koiller (Brazil): "For innovative research on electrons in disordered matter such as glass."
 Myriam P. Sarachik (United States): "For important experiments on electrical conduction and transitions between metals and insulators."

2005 Fellows 
2005 Fellowships awarded yearly to doctoral and post-doctoral women to allow them to pursue their research in host laboratories outside their home countries are:

2006 Laureates 
 Habiba Bouhamed Chaabouni (Tunisia): "For her contribution to the analysis and prevention of hereditary disorders."
 Jennifer Graves (Australia): "For studies on the evolution of mammalian genomes."
 Christine Van Broeckhoven (Belgium): "For the genetic investigation of Alzheimer's disease and other neurodegenerative diseases."
 Esther Orozco (Mexico): "For the discovery of the mechanisms and control of infections by amoebas in the tropics."
 Pamela Bjorkman (United States): "For the discovery of how the immune system recognizes targets."

2006 Fellows 
2006 Fellowships awarded yearly to doctoral and post-doctoral women to allow them to pursue their research in host laboratories outside their home countries are:

2007 Laureates 
 Ameenah Gurib-Fakim (Mauritius): "For her exploration and analysis of plants from Mauritius and their bio-medical applications."
 Ligia Gargallo (Chile): "For her contributions to understanding solution properties of polymers."
 Mildred Dresselhaus (United States): "For her research on solid state materials, including conceptualizing the creation of carbon nanotubes."
 Margaret Brimble (New Zealand): "For her contribution to the synthesis of complex natural products, especially shellfish toxins."
 Tatiana Birshtein (Russia): "For her contribution to the understanding of the shapes, sizes and motions of large molecules."

2007 Fellows 
2007 Fellowships awarded yearly to doctoral and post-doctoral women to allow them to pursue their research in host laboratories outside their home countries are:

2008 Laureates 
 Lihadh Al-Gazali (United Arab Emirates): "For her contributions to the characterization of inherited disorders."
 V. Narry Kim (South Korea): "For elucidating the formation of a new class of RNA molecules involved in gene regulation"
 Ada Yonath (Israel): "For her structural studies of the protein biosynthesis system and its disruption by antibiotics."
 Ana Belén Elgoyhen (Argentina): "For her contributions to the understanding of the molecular basis of hearing (sense)."
 Elizabeth Blackburn (United States): "For the discovery of the nature and maintenance of chromosome ends and their roles in cancer and aging."

2008 Fellows 
2008 Fellowships awarded yearly to doctoral and post-doctoral women to allow them to pursue their research in host laboratories outside their home countries are:

2009 Laureates 
 Tebello Nyokong (Africa and the Arab States): "for her work on harnessing light for cancer therapy and for environmental clean-up".
 Akiko Kobayashi (Asia-Pacific): "for her contribution to the development of molecular conductors and the design and synthesis of a single-component molecular metal".
 Athene M. Donald (Europe): "for her work in unraveling the mysteries of the physics of messy materials, ranging from cement to starch".
 Beatriz Barbuy (Latin America): "for her work on the life of stars from the birth of the Universe to the present time".
 Eugenia Kumacheva (North America): "for the design and development of new materials with many applications including targeted drug delivery for cancer treatments and materials for high density optical data storage".

2009 Fellows 
2009 Fellowships awarded yearly to doctoral and post-doctoral women to allow them to pursue their research in host laboratories outside their home countries are:

2010 Laureates 
 Rashika El Ridi (Africa and the Arab States): "for paving the way towards the development of a vaccine against the tropical disease schistosomiasis".
 Lourdes J. Cruz (Asia-Pacific): "for the discovery of marine snail toxins that can serve as powerful tools to study brain function".
 Anne Dejean-Assémat (Europe): "for her contributions to our understanding of leukaemia and liver cancers".
 Alejandra Bravo (Latin America): "for her work on a bacterial toxin that acts as a powerful insecticide".
 Elaine Fuchs (North America): "for her contributions to our knowledge of skin biology and skin stem cells".

2010 Fellows 
2010 Fellowships awarded yearly to doctoral and post-doctoral women to allow them to pursue their research in host laboratories outside their home countries are:

2011 Laureates 
 Faiza Al-Harafi (Africa and the Arab States): "for her work on corrosion, a problem of fundamental importance to water treatment and the oil industry; for her notable contributions to electrochemistry with particular emphasis on corrosion and catalysis".
 Vivian Wing-Wah Yam (Asia-Pacific): "for her work on light-emitting materials and innovative ways of capturing solar energy; for her pioneering contributions in the molecular design of photo-active materials that are particularly relevant to solar energy conversion".
 Anne L'Huillier (Europe): "for her work on the development of the fastest camera for recording the movement of electrons in attoseconds (a billionth of a billionth of a second); for her pioneering experimental and theoretical contributions to harmonic light generation as a base technology for attosecond science".
 Silvia Torres-Peimbert (Latin America): "for her work on the chemical composition of nebulae which is fundamental to our understanding of the origin of the universe; for her fundamental contribution to the studies of nebulae that have led to a better understanding of the chemical evolution of galaxies and the universe".
 Jillian Banfield (North America): "for her work on bacterial and material behavior under extreme conditions relevant to the environment and the Earth; for pioneering achievements in environmental science integrating chemical, biological, mineralogical, and proteogenomic influences".

2011 Fellows 
2011 Fellowships awarded yearly to doctoral and post-doctoral women to allow them to pursue their research in host laboratories outside their home countries are:

2012 Laureates 
 Jill Farrant (Africa and the Arab States): "for the elucidation of mechanisms by which plants overcome drought conditions".
 Ingrid Scheffer (Asia-Pacific): "for identifying genes involved in some forms of epilepsy".
 Frances Ashcroft (Europe): "for her discovery of an ATP-sensitive potassium channel linking glucose metabolism and insulin secretion and its role in neonatal diabetes".
 Susana López Charreton (Latin America): "for elucidating the mechanisms of rotavirus infections".
 Bonnie Bassler (North America): "for discovering the chemical signals and mechanisms bacteria use to communicate and coordinate group behaviors".

2012 Fellows 
2012 Fellowships awarded yearly to doctoral and post-doctoral women to allow them to pursue their research in host laboratories outside their home countries are:

2013 Laureates 
 Francisca Nneka Okeke (Africa and the Arab States): "for her significant contributions to the understanding of daily variations of the ion currents in the upper atmosphere which may further our understanding of climate change."
 Reiko Kuroda (Asia-Pacific): "for discovering the functional importance of the difference between left handed and right handed molecules which has wide applications including research on neurodegenerative diseases such as Alzheimer's."
 Pratibha Gai (Europe): "for ingeniously modifying her electron microscope so that she was able to observe chemical reactions occurring at surface atoms of catalysts which will help scientists in their development of new medicines or new energy sources."
 Marcia Barbosa (Latin America): "for discovering one of the peculiarities of water which may lead to better understanding of how earthquakes occur and how proteins fold which is important for the treatment of diseases."
 Deborah S. Jin (North America): "for having been the first to cool down molecules so much that she can observe chemical reactions in slow motion which may help further understanding of molecular processes which are important for medicine or new energy sources."

2013 Fellows 
2013 Fellowships awarded yearly to doctoral and post-doctoral women to allow them to pursue their research in host laboratories outside their home countries are:

2014 Laureates 
 Segenet Kelemu (Africa and the Arab States)
 Kayo Inaba (Asia-Pacific)
 Brigitte Kieffer (Europe) "for her decisive work on the brain mechanisms involved in pain, mental illness and drug addiction"
 Cecilia Bouzat (Argentina) "her contribution to our understanding of how brain cells communicate among themselves and with muscles"
 Laurie Glimcher (North America)

2014 Fellows 
2014 Fellowships awarded yearly to doctoral and post-doctoral women to allow them to pursue their research in host laboratories outside their home countries are:

2015 Laureates 
 Rajaâ Cherkaoui El Moursli (Africa and the Arab States): "For her key contribution to one of the greatest discoveries in physics: proof of the existence of the Higgs Boson, the particle responsible for the creation of mass in the universe."
 Xie Yi (Asia-Pacific): "For her significant contributions to inorganic solid state solvothermal chemistry at the nanoscale, particularly unconventional semi-conductor materials and graphene-like structures a few atoms thick."
 Dame Carol Robinson (Europe): "For her groundbreaking work in macromolecular mass spectrometry and pioneering gas phase structural biology by probing the structure and reactivity of single proteins and protein complexes, including membrane proteins."
 Thaisa Storchi Bergmann (Latin America): "For her outstanding work on super-massive black holes in the centers of galaxies and their associated regions of dense gas, dust, and young stars surrounding them, as well as their role in the evolution of galaxies."
 Molly S. Shoichet (North America): "For her pioneering work on advanced laser photochemistry for creating 3D patterns in hydrogels that enable regeneration of nerve tissue."

2015 International Rising Talents 
Established in 2015, the International Rising Talent Grants are awarded annually to 15 PhD students and post-doctoral Fellows. Fellows are chosen from among the winners of the 236 fellowships awarded locally by L’Oréal subsidiaries and UNESCO around the world, to give additional support at the international level to promising young women researchers. They replace the former International Fellowships. The 2015 International Rising Talents are:

2016 Laureates 

 Emmanuelle Charpentier Germany, molecular biology – human genome
 Jennifer Doudna United States, molecular biology – human genome
 Quarraisha Abdool Karim South Africa, prevention and treatment of HIV
 Chen Hualan China, biology of the bird flu virus and vaccine
 Andrea Gamarnik Argentina, Molecular virology (mosquito-borne viruses and Dengue Fever).

2016 International Rising Talents 
The L’Oréal-UNESCO For Women in Science programme established the International Rising Talent Grants, awarded annually to 15 PhD students and post-doctoral Fellows who are chosen among the former winners of the 236 fellowships awarded locally by L’Oréal subsidiaries and UNESCO around the world. The goal is to support promising women researchers and give them more visibility so that, through the awards, these young scientists can achieve the increased recognition that their talent deserve, but dod not always receive, both within their country and by their peers. International Rising Talents are chosen from countries in each world region, Africa & Arab States, Asia-Pacific, Europe, Latin America and North America. The 2016 L'Oréal-UNESCO International Rising Talents are:

2017 Laureates 
 Niveen Khashab (Saudi Arabia) "For her contributions to innovative smart hybrid materials aimed at drug delivery and for developing new techniques to monitor intracellular antioxidant activity."
 Michelle Simmons (Australia) "For her pioneering contributions to quantum and atomic electronics, constructing atomic transistors en route to quantum computers."
 Nicola Spaldin (Switzerland) "For her groundbreaking multidisciplinary work predicting, describing and creating new materials that have switchable magnetic and ferroelectric properties."
 Zhenan Bao (United States of America) "For her outstanding contribution to and mastery of the development of novel functional polymers for consumer electronics, energy storage and biomedical applications."
 María Teresa Ruiz (Chile) "For her discovery of the first brown dwarf and her seminal work on understanding the faintest stars, including stars at the final stages of their evolution (white dwarfs)."

2017 International Rising Talents 
In 2014, the L’Oréal-UNESCO programme has established the International Rising Talent Grants, awarded annually to 15 PhD students and post-doctoral Fellows.
These young researchers are chosen among the former winners of the 250 fellowships awarded locally by L’Oréal subsidiaries and UNESCO Field Offices around the world.  By recognizing their achievements at a key moment in their careers, the For Women in Science programme aims to help them pursue their research.

2018 Laureates 
 Heather Zar (South Africa) Medicine and Health Sciences/Pediatrics "For establishing a cutting-edge research programme in pneumonia, tuberculosis and asthma, saving the lives of many children worldwide."
 Meemann Chang (China) Biological Sciences/Paleontology, "For her pioneering work on fossil records leading to insights on how aquatic vertebrates adapted to life on land."
 Caroline Dean (United Kingdom) Biological Sciences/Molecular biology "For her groundbreaking research on how plants adapt to their surroundings and climate change, leading to new ways for crop improvement."
 Amy T. Austin (Argentina) Ecology and Environmental sciences "For her remarkable contributions to understanding terrestrial ecosystem ecology in natural and human-modified landscapes."
 Janet Rossant (Canada) Biological Sciences/Developmental biology, "For her outstanding research that helped us to better understand how tissues and organs are formed in the developing embryo."

2018 International Rising Talents 
Each year, the International Rising Talents programme selects the 15 most promising women scientists among the 275 national and regional fellows of the L’Oréal-UNESCO For Women In Science programme. These young women are the very future of science and recognizing their excellence will help ensure that they reach their full potential.

2019 Laureates 
 Najat A. Saliba, for her pioneering work in identifying carcinogenic agents and other toxic air pollutants in the Middle East
 Maki Kawai, for her ground-breaking work in manipulating molecules at the atomic level, in order to transform materials and create innovative materials
 Karen Hallberg, for developing cutting-edge computational approaches that allow scientists to understand the physics of quantum matter
 Ingrid Daubechies, for her exceptional contribution to the numerical treatment of images and signal processing, providing standard and flexible algorithms for data compression
 Claire Voisin, for her outstanding work in algebraic geometry

2019 International Rising Talents 
Among the 275 national and regional fellowship winners supported each year, the For Women in Science programme selects the 15 most promising researchers for this international recognition.

2020 Laureates 
 Abla Mehio Sibai, for her pioneering research and advocacy to improve healthy ageing in low- and middle-income countries and their impact on health and social policy programmes
 Firdausi Qadri, for her outstanding work to understand and prevent infectious diseases affecting children in developing countries, and promote early diagnosis and vaccination with global health impact
 Edith Heard, for her fundamental discoveries concerning the mechanisms governing epigenetic processes, which allow mammals to regulate proper gene expression and are essential for life.
 Esperanza Martínez-Romero, for her pioneering work on the use of environmentally friendly bacteria to support plant growth for increased agricultural productivity and reduced use of chemical fertilizers.
 Kristi Anseth, for her outstanding contribution in converging engineering and biology to develop innovative biomaterials that help tissue regeneration and drug delivery

2020 International Rising Talents 
Among the national and regional fellowship winners supported each year, the For Women in Science programme selects the 15 most promising researchers for this international recognition.

2021 Laureates 
 Catherine Ngila, Recognized for introducing, developing and applying nanotechnology-based analytical methods to monitor water pollutants. Her innovative work is of vital importance for the development of water resource management in an environmentally sustainable way.
 Kyoko Nozaki, Recognized for her pioneering, creative contributions within the field of synthetic chemistry, and their importance to industrial innovation. Her research has led to new, highly effective and environmentally friendly production processes to manufacture molecules useful for medicine and sustainable agriculture. 
 Alicia Dickenstein, Recognized for her outstanding contributions at the forefront of mathematical innovation by leveraging algebraic geometry in the field of molecular biology. Her research enables scientists to understand the structures and behaviour of cells and molecules, even on a microscopic scale. Operating at the frontier between pure and applied mathematics, she has forged important links to physics and chemistry, and enabled biologists to gain an in-depth structural understanding of biochemical reactions and enzymatic networks. 
 Shafi Goldwasser, Recognized for her pioneering and fundamental work in computer science and cryptography, essential for secure communication over the internet as well as for shared computation on private data. Her research has a significant impact on our understanding of large classes of problems for which computers cannot efficiently find even approximate solutions.
 Françoise Combes, Recognized for her outstanding contribution to astrophysics which ranges from the discovery of molecules in interstellar space to supercomputer simulations of galaxy formation. Her work has been crucial to our understanding of the birth and evolution of stars and galaxies, including the role played by supermassive black holes in galactic centers.

2022 Laureates 
 Dr. Anna Czarkwiani "De novo thymus regeneration in the axolotl"
 Dr. Svetlana Klementyeva "Germanium Cluster – neue Bausteine in der Chemie der Seltenen Erden"
 Dr. Darinka Trübutschek "Wie sieht das menschliche Gehirn – Entschlüsselung des Zusammenspiels von Wahrnehmung und Gedächtnis"
 Dr. Eteri Svanidze "Quantenmaterialien – vom Labor zur alltäglichen Anwendung"

Regional progr"ammes 
"Women in Science" has national and regional awards.

See also 

 Women in science
 Women in chemistry
 List of science and technology awards for women
 List of general science and technology awards

References

External links 

 
 For Women in Science at UNESCO
 UNESCO: Gender and Science

Awards established in 1998
French science and technology awards
 
 
Lists of women scientists
UNESCO awards